Noah Heward (born 11 October 2000) is an English rugby union player.

References

External links
Worcester Warriors Profile
ESPN Profile
Ultimate Rugby Profile

2000 births
Living people
English rugby union players
Rugby union players from Redditch
Worcester Warriors players
Rugby union fullbacks